The Birmingham Journal was the first newspaper known to have been published in Birmingham, England. Little is known of it as few records remain, but a single copy survives in the Library of Birmingham: Number 28, dated Monday May 21, 1733. It is assumed from this that the first edition was probably published on 14 November 1732.

Background

The newspaper was published weekly (on Thursday) by local businessman and bookseller Thomas Warren from his house over the Swan Tavern in the High Street. Among its contributors was Samuel Johnson, whose work for the Journal while he was lodging with Warren in Birmingham in 1733 was his first original published writing. James Boswell wrote of this in his Life of Johnson:

Publication of the Birmingham Journal is known to have ceased by 1741.

Johnson's role
There is no physical record that documents to what extent Johnson played a part in the making of the Journal. It is known that Johnson was asked by Warren to work on the paper, and that Warren respected the extent of Johnson's knowledge to the point that he wanted to harness it for the Journal. There was an old tradition among the Birmingham bookselling community that Johnson was an "assistant" to Warren and that Johnson wrote several of the essays that were printed in the paper. However, this cannot be verified because none of the papers printed during the months that Johnson could have worked on the Journal have survived.

References

Defunct newspapers published in the United Kingdom
History of Birmingham, West Midlands
Newspapers published in Birmingham, West Midlands
Essay collections by Samuel Johnson
Publications established in 1732
Publications disestablished in 1741
18th century in Birmingham, West Midlands